Slater Koekkoek (born February 18, 1994) is a Canadian professional ice hockey defenceman currently  under contract to the Edmonton Oilers of the National Hockey League (NHL). Koekkoek was originally selected by the Tampa Bay Lightning, 10th overall, in the 2012 NHL Entry Draft.

Playing career

Junior
Koekkoek was a first round selection of the Peterborough Petes in the 2010 OHL Priority Selection. Koekkoek played 4 seasons and 195 games in the Ontario Hockey League having played 131 games with the Peterborough Petes and 64 with the Windsor Spitfires. During his 2nd season with the Peterborough Petes he only played in 26 games before suffering a season-ending shoulder injury in November. He was traded mid-season to Windsor on January 10, 2013, and in his last season, he set a career high and recorded 15 goals and 53 points, and finished with a +44 rating and 51 penalty minutes.

Professional
Koekkoek was selected 10th overall in the 2012 NHL Entry Draft by the Tampa Bay Lightning. He was signed by the Lightning to a three-year entry level contract on March 20, 2013, and was assigned to the Canadian Hockey League the first 2 years. Koekkoek made his professional hockey debut on October 12, 2014, against the Hartford Wolf Pack. In 66 games with the Crunch, Koekkoek had five goals and 24 points to go along with 40 penalty minutes. Koekkoek led all Crunch defensemen in assists (19) and points (24). He also is tied for fifth among American Hockey League rookie defensemen in points.

Koekkoek made his NHL debut with the Tampa Bay Lightning on March 31, 2015, in his home province of Ontario losing 3–1 against the Toronto Maple Leafs recording 2 shots and a –1 rating. Koekkoek skated 15:31 in the game. Lightning head coach Jon Cooper stated that "he can be proud of how he played," and that "he was up in the play, and he did some good things. He defended well, and I was happy with him." On April 8, 2015, the Tampa Bay Lightning announced that Koekkoek had been reassigned to the Syracuse Crunch of the American Hockey League. Koekkoek skated in three games with the Lightning, recording two penalty minutes and six shots.

On March 7, 2016, Koekkoek recorded his first career NHL assist and first NHL point in a 2–4 loss to the Philadelphia Flyers. On April 30, 2016, Koekkoek appeared in his first NHL playoff game, which was a 4–1 Lightning win over the New York Islanders. On May 24, 2016, Koekkoek recorded his first career playoff assist and point, which came in a 2–5 Lightning loss to the Pittsburgh Penguins.

On July 3, 2017, Koekkoek signed a one-year, $800,000 contract extension with the Lightning. On October 12, 2017, Koekkoek recorded his first and second career NHL goals. Koekkoek's second goal was the game-winning goal in a 5–4 Lightning win over the visiting Pittsburgh Penguins. 

During the 2018–19 season, with Koekkoek unable to establish himself on the Championship contending Lightning and having been passed on the depth chart, Koekkoek was traded by the Lightning along with a 2019 fifth-round pick to the Chicago Blackhawks in exchange for Jan Rutta and a 2019 seventh-round pick on January 11, 2019.

As a free agent from the Blackhawks, on December 26, 2020, Koekkoek was signed to a one-year, $850,000 deal with the Edmonton Oilers. On August 12, he signed a two-year contract extension with the Oilers.

While Koekkoek remains under contract to the Oilers organization, he stepped away from the team before the  training camp and he has not suited up in any games since the 2021–22 season, where he appeared in 19. On March 15, 2023, Koekkoek revealed via his LinkedIn profile that he has stepped away for mental health reasons regarding his anxiety and inability to eat while dealing with it.

International play
Koekkoek first competed at the international stage at the 2011 World U-17 Hockey Challenge in helping Canada Ontario claim the gold medal.

Koekkoek represented the Canadian under-18 national team at the 2011 IIHF World U18 Championships, where he had two points in seven games and helped Canada win bronze medals. In the 2011 Ivan Hlinka Memorial Tournament, Koekkoek served as an alternate captain, where he led Canada to the gold medal with his defensive scoring with five points in five games.

Career statistics

Regular season and playoffs

International

Awards and honours

References

External links
 

1994 births
Living people
Bakersfield Condors players
Canadian ice hockey defencemen
Canadian people of Dutch descent
Chicago Blackhawks players
Edmonton Oilers players
Ice hockey people from Ontario
National Hockey League first-round draft picks
Notre Dame Hounds players
People from the United Counties of Stormont, Dundas and Glengarry
Peterborough Petes (ice hockey) players
Syracuse Crunch players
Tampa Bay Lightning draft picks
Tampa Bay Lightning players
Windsor Spitfires players